Andrei Vasilyevich Starovoytov (16 December 1915 – 22 March 1997) was a Soviet ice hockey administrator, referee and player. He won three Soviet ice hockey championships as a player, and was later an ice hockey referee at eight World Championships. He was the general secretary of the Soviet Union Ice Hockey Federation for 17 years, and negotiated Soviet participation in the Summit Series. He was posthumously inducted into the IIHF Hall of Fame.

Early life
Starovoytov was born 16 December 1915. He started playing ice hockey and bandy as a youth in Smolensk during the 1930s. He later played as a defenceman for HC CSKA Moscow from 1946 to 1951. He was part of the championship team in 1948, 1949 and 1950, and scored 10 goals in 50 games in the Soviet championships. He was coached by Anatoly Tarasov, and played with other notable teammates including, Boris Afanasiev, Aleksandr Komarov, Grigory Mkrtychan, Nikolai Sologubov and Dmitry Ukolov.

Starovoytov later served as an ice hockey referee in the top tier of Soviet hockey from 1951 to 1969. He officiated at the Ice Hockey World Championships eight times including, 1955, the 1956 Winter Olympics, 1957, 1958, 1961, 1963, 1965 and 1966. He was named one of the top ten referees in Soviet hockey in 12 different seasons. He was also a member of the International Ice Hockey Federation (IIHF) referee council from 1969 to 1986.

Administration career
Starovoytov served as the general secretary of the Soviet Union Ice Hockey Federation from 1969 to 1986. During that period, the Soviet Union national ice hockey team won three gold medals at the Winter Olympic Games, and 12 gold medals at the Ice Hockey World Championships. He negotiated with Joe Kryczka of the Canadian Amateur Hockey Association for the Soviet national team to play the Canada men's national ice hockey team in what became known as the 1972 Summit Series. The agreement was signed and announced on 18 April 1972, at the Hotel International Prague during the 1972 World Ice Hockey Championships, and approved by Bunny Ahearne and Fred Page of the IIHF. Starovoytov agreed to the eight-game series feeling that his Soviet players would be able to defeat Canadian professionals from the National Hockey League. His confidence was evident from an interview with journalist Red Fisher, where Starovoytov believed his country could win all eight games. Canada prevailed with four wins and a draw in eight games, but he was not deterred in having another competition. During the 1974 World Junior Ice Hockey Championships, Starovoytov approached Canadian leaders Jack Devine and Gordon Juckes, regarding having another series. The 1974 Summit Series was agreed to be a six-games series versus professionals from the World Hockey Association, but was later extended to eight games. The Soviets took the rematch with four wins and three draws in the eight games.

Later life and honors
Starovoytov received the Olympic Order in 1986 for contributions to ice hockey. He was made an honorary life member of the IIHF in 1986, and then was posthumously inducted as builder into the IIHF Hall of Fame in 1997, after he died 22 March 1997. The Kontinental Hockey League annually honors its referee of the year with the Andrei Starovoytov Award, also called the "Golden Whistle".

References

External links

 1949–50 HC CSKA Moscow team photo

1915 births
1997 deaths
1972 Summit Series
HC CSKA Moscow players
Ice hockey people from Moscow
International Ice Hockey Federation executives
IIHF Hall of Fame inductees
Olympic officials
Recipients of the Olympic Order
Russian bandy players
Russian ice hockey administrators
Russian ice hockey officials
Soviet ice hockey defencemen
Sportspeople from Smolensk